The name Summarit is used by Leica to designate camera lenses that have a maximum aperture of f/2.4. The name has been in used since 1949.

History
The Summarit was initially introduced as Leica's fastest lens in 1949 with a maximum aperture of f/1.5. Since then, the Noctilux and Summilux named lenses have superseded this old aperture.

On 3 August 2007 Leica revived the name and announced a series of less expensive lenses, the Summarit-M. The Summarit-M lenses work on Leica M-series film and digital rangefinder cameras.

Description
In its current iteration the Summarit lenses have a maximum f-number of f/2.4.

Market positions
Leica introduced these less expensive lenses, which also fit Leica M mount cameras like the recent Cosina (Carl Zeiss AG and Voigtländer brands) lenses as an alternative to its main line professional and expensive lenses.

List of Summarit lenses

For the M39 lens mount
 Summarit 50 mm 

For the Leica M mount
 Summarit-M 35 mm  ASPH.
 Summarit-M 50 mm 
 Summarit-M 75 mm 
 Summarit-M 90 mm 

For the Leica S mount
 Summarit-S 35 mm  ASPH.
 Summarit-S 35 mm  ASPH. CS
 Summarit-S 70 mm  ASPH.
 Summarit-S 70 mm  ASPH. CS
 Summicron-S 100 mm  ASPH.
 Apo-Macro-Summarit-S 120 mm 
 Apo-Macro-Summarit-S 120 mm  CS

References

External links
 

Leica lenses
Photographic lenses